The 1997 Austrian motorcycle Grand Prix was the fifth round of the 1997 Grand Prix motorcycle racing season. It took place on 1 June 1997 at the A1-Ring.

500 cc classification

250cc classification

125cc classification

References

Austrian motorcycle Grand Prix
Austrian
Motorcycle Grand Prix